Loitokitok Airstrip is an airstrip in Loitokitok, Kenya.

Location
Loitokitok Airstrip is located in the town of Loitokitok, Kajiado County, in southeastern Kenya, at the International border with the Republic of Tanzania. The airport lies to the northeast of the town's central business district.

The geographic coordinates of this airport are:2° 54' 25.00"S, 37° 31' 17.00"E (Latitude:-2.9069453; Longitude:37.521389).

Overview
Loitokitok Airstrip serves the town of Loitokitok and the adjacent communities.

Airlines and destinations
At the moment there are no regular, scheduled airline services to Loitokitok Airstrip.

See also
 Kenya Airports Authority
 Kenya Civil Aviation Authority
 List of airports in Kenya

References

External links
  Location of Loitokitok Airport At Google Maps
  Website of Kenya Airports Authority
  Airkenya Flight Routes
 

Airports in Kenya
Airports in Rift Valley Province
Kajiado County
Mount Kilimanjaro